The following is a list of rosters of the UCI Continental team, Astana City, categorised by season.

2019

2018

2017

2016 
Roster in 2016, age as of 1 January 2016:

2015 
Roster in 2015, age as of 1 January 2015:

2014 
Roster in 2014, age as of 1 January 2014:

2013 
Roster in 2013, age as of 1 January 2013:

2012 
Roster in 2012, age as of 1 January 2012:

References

Astana City rosters